David Levi (born December 2, 1962 in Tel Aviv, Israel) is an Israeli professional poker player and former professional footballer who in his poker career has won over $2.6 million in live tournaments.

Levi, who was born and raised in Israel, was a paratrooper in the Israel Defense Forces and then later played soccer professionally for Hapoel Ramat Gan. After his soccer career was cut short by a knee injury, he then moved to Los Angeles, California where he was introduced to poker and was once the roommate of professional poker player and friend Amir Vahedi. A few years later he moved to Las Vegas, Nevada where he currently resides.

As of 2020, his total live tournament winnings exceed $4,000,000. His 37 cashes at the WSOP account for $553,434 of those winnings.

World Series of Poker 
Levi has multiple cashes at the World Series of Poker (WSOP), which includes two final tables, and has made the final table of the 2005 WSOP Tournament of Champions. His highest finish in the Main Event was 121st in 2007.

World Poker Tour 
Levi has finished in the money at 10 World Poker Tour (WPT) championship events, making the final  table in season six at the 2007 Mandalay Bay Poker Championship where he finished 3rd earning $229,540. He also made a final table of the WPT offspring known as the Professional Poker Tour, where he finished 3rd at the Mirage Poker Showdown event in 2005.

Other poker events 
Levi has over 20 first place victories in various event over his poker career. In April 2002, he won the '$3,100 No Limit Hold'em' event at the Bellagio High Buy-in Tournament Series, after he had defeated WPT Champion Alan Goehring during heads-up play, earning $159,468, winning the $1,500 Limit Hold'em event at the 2003 Bellagio Five-Diamond World Poker Classic, earning $144,917 and winning California State Poker Championship in 2000, earning $26,751, and then again in 2004, earning $99,745.

References

External links
 World Poker Tour profile
 CardPlayer.com profile

1962 births
Living people
Israeli footballers
People from Tel Aviv
Israeli poker players
Association footballers not categorized by position